Suan County is a county in North Hwanghae province, North Korea.

Administrative divisions
Suan county is divided into 1 ŭp (town), 1 rodongjagu (workers' districts) and 17 ri (villages):

References

Counties of North Hwanghae